KMYU (channel 12) is a television station licensed to St. George, Utah, United States, serving as the MyNetworkTV affiliate for the state of Utah. It is owned by Sinclair Broadcast Group alongside Salt Lake City–based CBS affiliate KUTV (channel 2) and independent station KJZZ-TV (channel 14). Outside of southwestern Utah, KMYU is broadcast statewide on KUTV and its dependent translators (as subchannel 2.2), and KUTV is similarly rebroadcast by KMYU.

KUTV's plans to install a high-power station in southern Utah dated to the late 1980s, but while KUTV began selling local advertising on its existing southern Utah transmitters in 1993, what was then known as KUSG did not begin broadcasting until 1999. In 2008, the station was spun out as "Utah's RTN", an affiliate of the Retro Television Network, which switched to programming from This TV in 2009 and to MyNetworkTV in 2010. KMYU airs MyNetworkTV and syndicated shows as well as repeats of KUTV newscasts and several local sports programs.

History
In 1986, Steven D. King, an Atlanta businessman, successfully petitioned the Federal Communications Commission (FCC) to add channel 12 to St. George as its first full-service television allocation. In 1987, applications were received from Red Mountain Broadcasting Company, whose backers included Jim Rogers, owner of Las Vegas station KVBC; and by KUTV, Inc. The FCC designated these applications for comparative hearing in February 1988, but before the hearing could begin, a settlement agreement was reached and approved on May 23 in which KUTV was granted the permit.

Even though the station would not begin broadcasting until 1999, KUTV began to lay the groundwork for the new station, which received the call sign KUSG. Potential was also recognized for KUSG to possibly create a new media market for southern Utah that then could lead to KCCZ in Cedar City becoming a network affiliate as well. KUTV then drew the ire of Washington County, which owned the translators by which KUTV was broadcasting in the area, by proposing to begin local advertising insertion for the St. George area on the translators—in part to begin building an advertising base in southern Utah. This was possible because of the way the signal was delivered from Salt Lake City. The first hop on the translator network going south was at Levan. The KUTV translator at Levan, which was owned by the station, was authorized as a low-power television station with program origination capabilities. However, competing broadcasters, especially KCCZ, believed the deal gave KUTV an unfair advantage by allowing it to use translator infrastructure owned by local authorities. To defuse this controversy, KUTV management worked out deals with service companies who took over maintenance of the translators in Washington and Iron counties, and local ad insertion began in February 1992. In the meantime, plans to build KUSG itself continued to be delayed.

KUSG began broadcasting on August 21, 1999, and initially operated as a satellite station of KUTV. However, after Four Points Media Group, a broadcast holding company operated by private equity firm Cerberus Capital Management, acquired KUTV, KUSG, and other smaller-market CBS-owned stations in January 2008, Four Points spun out KUSG with separate programming. It became known as "Utah's RTN", an affiliate of the Retro Television Network (RTN) featuring Southern Utah news updates from KUTV; KUTV remained available over the air from its other translator on channel 49 as well as on cable and satellite, and the station estimated this switch left a small number of viewers without KUTV programming.

Equity Media Holdings, which owned RTN, soon fell into major financial difficulties. Initially, KUSG's RTN programming was relayed on Equity-owned KUBX-LP (channel 58) in Salt Lake City and KCBU (channel 3) in Price, which respectively brought the station's programming into Salt Lake City and earned it must-carry status on cable and satellite systems. However, on January 4, 2009, a contract conflict between Equity and Luken Communications (which had acquired RTN in June 2008) interrupted the programming on many RTN affiliates. As a result, Luken moved RTN operations to its headquarters in Chattanooga, Tennessee, and dropped all Equity-owned affiliates, including KUBX and KCBU, immediately. KUSG itself was not affected (aside from the aforementioned interruption in network programming), as it is not an Equity station, but its satellite and Salt Lake City-area Comcast coverage was lost, as they received the station's programming via KUBX/KCBU.

By June 2009, KUSG had dropped RTN (which rebranded to RTV that month) for This TV; it then added programming from MyNetworkTV on September 20, 2010, and changed its call sign to KMYU on November 16, 2010. Outside of MyNetworkTV, KMYU continued to air This TV programs until 2015. On September 8, 2011, Sinclair Broadcast Group announced its intent to purchase Four Points from Cerberus Capital Management for $200 million; Sinclair began managing the stations, including KMYU, under local marketing agreements following antitrust approval. The deal was completed on January 3, 2012.

In September and early October 2011, the station aired NBC's new period drama The Playboy Club in lieu of KSL-TV (channel 5), which refused to air it due to management concerns about content and the program's promotion of Playboy magazine. The program aired at NBC's original Monday night 9 p.m. (MT) timeslot for the series on KMYU. Like Coupling in 2003 however, which KSL also declined to air and aired on the then-KUWB (channel 30, now KUCW), it only aired three episodes before the network made it the first canceled new series of the new television season.

In 2017, Sinclair proposed the purchase of Tribune Media, which owned Salt Lake City Fox affiliate KSTU (channel 13). As part of divestitures related to the deal, Sinclair announced in April 2018 that it would have sold KMYU to Howard Stirk Holdings while continuing to provide services to the station. However, flaws with the deal in other cities—notably Chicago, Dallas, Houston, and St. Louis—resulted in the FCC commissioners designating the transaction for hearing before an administrative law judge in July 2018, which led to its cancellation the following month.

Local programming
KMYU's sports programming includes live Utah High School Activities Association high school football games, including state championships; KMYU also airs Talkin' Sports, a nightly sports talk show aired after KUTV's 10 p.m. newscast, which it simulcasts. In 2015, KMYU became the main regional broadcaster of Major League Soccer's Real Salt Lake. Sinclair renewed its contract in 2018. KMYU has also aired matches from RSL's reserve team Real Monarchs (in the USL) and its women's team Utah Royals FC (NWSL).

Newscasts
After KUSG adopted its own separate schedule in 2008, it began airing Southern Utah-specific news updates. Even though multiple KUTV newscasts are repeated or simulcast on KMYU, the station has no dedicated newscasts. National news coverage is provided by the Sinclair-produced The National Desk and the airing of Sinclair's Full Measure with Sharyl Attkisson.

Technical information

Subchannels
The station's digital signal is multiplexed:

Analog-to-digital conversion
KMYU shut down its analog signal, over VHF channel 12, on June 12, 2009, as part of the federally mandated transition from analog to digital television, continuing to broadcast in digital on VHF channel 9 (using virtual channel 12).

Translators

Two translators in Iron County rebroadcast KMYU, with most of its coverage coming as a KUTV subchannel on that station's translators.

 Parowan, Enoch, Paragonah: K35NT-D
 Rural Beaver, etc.: K19GS-D

Notes

References

External links

KUTV.com – KUTV official website

Television channels and stations established in 1999
1999 establishments in Utah
MyNetworkTV affiliates
Sinclair Broadcast Group
MYU
Major League Soccer over-the-air television broadcasters
Real Salt Lake broadcasters
St. George, Utah